Kandalakshsky District is an administrative district (a raion), one of the six in Murmansk Oblast, Russia. As a municipal division, it is incorporated as Kandalakshsky Municipal District. It is located in the southwest of the oblast, and borders with Kovdorsky District to the north, Loukhsky District of the Republic of Karelia, and with Finland to the west. Its administrative center is the town of Kandalaksha. Population:  The population of Kandalaksha accounts for 72.0% of the district's total population.

History
The district was first established by the All-Russian Central Executive Committee (VTsIK) Resolution of August 29, 1927 along with other new districts into which the Karelian ASSR was divided. The district included the territories of Kandalakshskaya and Kovdskaya Volosts and the village of Kyurela of Kestengskaya Volost. The administrative center of the district was in the selo of Kandalaksha.

On June 1, 1932, Kandalaksha was granted work settlement status. On April 1, 1937, the VTsIK adopted a Resolution on the administrative-territorial structure of the district, according to which the district included two work settlements (Kandalaksha and Nivsky) and five selsoviets (Kandalakshsky, Knyazhegubsky, Kolvitsky, Konets-Kovdozersky, and Kovdsky). On April 20, 1938, Kandalaksha was granted a status of town of district significance.

On May 28, 1938, the district became a part of the newly formed Murmansk Oblast, and on February 9, 1940, Kandalaksha was administratively separated from the district and granted a status of town of oblast significance.

Kandalakshsky District was abolished by the Decree of the Presidium of the Supreme Soviet of the Soviet Union on August 18, 1948 with its territory being administratively subordinated to the town of Kandalaksha. However, the district was reinstated in old borders by another decree on March 13, 1951. Kandalaksha again became the administrative center of the district.

By the Decree of the Presidium of the Supreme Soviet of the Soviet Union, on February 24, 1955 Alakurttinsky Selsoviet was transferred to Kandalakshsky District from Kestengsky District of the Karelo-Finnish SSR.

By the Decree of the Presidium of the Supreme Soviet of the RSFSR of March 19, 1959, the Councils of Deputies of Kandalaksha and of Kandalakshsky District were merged into one Kandalaksha Town Council of Deputies. The district was nominally retained as a separate administrative division, but all its subdivisions were administratively subordinated to the town's Council of Deputies. On February 1, 1963, the Decree by the Presidium of the Supreme Soviet of the RSFSR established the new structure of the districts of Murmansk Oblast, which no longer included Kandalakshsky District.

On December 2, 2004, Kandalakshsky Municipal District was established by Murmansk Oblast Duma on the territory of Kandalaksha Town With Jurisdictional Territory. The administrative district, however, was not restored until the law of April 11, 2011 amended the law on the administrative-territorial divisions of Murmansk Oblast to include it.

Geography
Kandalaksha District sits in the southwest corner of Murmansk Olblast, covering 9.9% of the Murmansk region.  A small part of the district is on the Kola Peninsula and the remainder on the mainland.  It borders Finland to the west and the Republic of Karelia to the south.  Kandalaksha Gulf is on the eastern border of the district.  Most of the district is forested (60%) with pine and northern-taiga spruce-pine trees.  Much of the remainder is lakes and rivers.  The southern islands and territories of the Kandalaksha Nature Reserve are in the district.

Notable residents 

Galina Shirshina (born 1979 in Alakurtti village), mayor of Petrozavodsk
Venedikt Yerofeyev (born 1938 in Niva-3 settlement, suburb of Kandalaksha), writer and Soviet dissident

References

Sources

External links
Official website of Kandalakhsky District 
A website about Kandalaksha and its vicinity



Districts of Murmansk Oblast
States and territories established in 1927
States and territories disestablished in 1948
States and territories established in 1951
States and territories disestablished in 1963
States and territories established in 2011